The Fifth Annual Jim Crockett Sr. Memorial Cup Tag Team Tournament (also known as the Crockett Cup (2022)), was a professional wrestling tag team tournament produced by the National Wrestling Alliance (NWA). The event took place on March 19 and 20, 2022, at the Nashville Fairgrounds in Nashville, Tennessee. It was the sixth iteration of the event, and the first to be held since 2019; the 2020 event had been planned, but was cancelled due to the COVID-19 pandemic, and no event was scheduled in 2021 because of the lingering pandemic.

Production

Background
The Jim Crockett Sr. Memorial Cup Tag Team Tournament is a tag team tournament first held in April 1986. National Wrestling Alliance (NWA) member Jim Crockett Promotions (JCP), headed by Jim Crockett Jr., hosted the Crockett Cup, held in honor of Crockett's father, JCP founder Jim Crockett Sr. and saw participation of teams from various NWA territories. JCP held the tournament again in 1987 and 1988, before JCP was sold to Ted Turner later that year. In July 2017, the Crockett Foundation, with Classic Pro Wrestling, held the "Crockett Foundation Cup Tag Team Tournament" in New Kent, Virginia, which was not affiliated with the NWA. Bobby Fulton, The Barbarian, and The Rock 'n' Roll Express, all former Crockett Cup participants, took part in the event as a link to the original tournaments.

The original concept of the Crockett Cup was a single elimination tag team tournament, with the storyline prize of $1,000,000.00 given to the winning team along with a large trophy. The 1986 and 1987 tournaments featured 24 teams, while the 1988 version had 22 teams competing. Each tournament was split over two shows to encompass all 23 tournament matches as well as non-tournament matches; in 1986, JCP held a show in the afternoon and another in the evening, while the 1987 and 1988, the tournament was spread out over two days instead.

On January 31, 2022, it was announced that the Crockett Cup would return and would be held in on March 19–20 at the Nashville Fairgrounds in Nashville, Tennessee.

Storylines
The event will feature a number professional wrestling matches with different wrestlers involved in pre-existing scripted feuds, plots, and storylines. Wrestlers are portrayed as either heels (those that portray the "bad guys"), faces (the "good guy" characters), or tweeners (characters that are neither clearly a heel or a face) as they follow a series of tension-building events, which culminate in a wrestling match or series of matches as determined by the promotion. The seventh season of the NWA's weekly flagship program, Powerr, featured storylines leading up to the event.

Tournament matches
The main feature of the event is the titular Crockett Cup, a tag team tournament where, in addition to the namesake trophy, the winners will earn a match for the NWA World Tag Team Championship. The tournament will be contested with 16 teams, double the amount of the 2019 event.

The following teams have been announced for the tournament:
La Rebelión (Bestia 666 and Mecha Wolf) (NWA World Tag Team Champions)
The Briscoe Brothers (Jay Briscoe and Mark Briscoe) (ROH World Tag Team Champions)
Doug Williams and Harry Smith
Strictly Business (Chris Adonis & Thom Latimer)
The OGK (Mike Bennett and Matt Taven)
The Fixers (Jay Bradley and Wrecking Ball Legursky) 
Matthew Mims and The Pope
Aron Stevens and JR Kratos (later replaced by The Blue Meanie)
Gold Rushhh (Jordan Clearwater and Marshe Rockett)
The End (Odinson and Parrow)
Hawx Aerie (Luke Hawx and PJ Hawx)
The Dirty Sexy Boys (Dirty Dango and JTG)
The Cardonas (Mike Knox and VSK)
The Ill Begotten (Alex Taylor and Rush Freeman)
The NOW (Hale Collins and Vik Dalishus)

In addition, Night 1 on March 19 will feature a four-way match to determine the 16 seed in the tournament. The teams are:
Violence Is Forever (Dominic Garrini and Kevin Ku)
The Bad News Boyz (Brandon Tate and Brent Tate)
The Rip City Shooters (Joshua Bishop and Wes Barkley)
The Heatseekers (Elliott Russell and Sigmon)

Other matches
During the full card run-down for Hard Times 2, NWA President Billy Corgan announced the return of the NWA World Junior Heavyweight Championship, which has been inactive for five years, with the four-way tournament final to determine the new champion taking place on March 20. Matches from the Junior Heavyweight tournament were taped for the NWA's new weekly series, NWA USA. The four way match will feature Austin Aries, Homicide, Darius Lockhart and Colby Corino compete for the vacant World Junior Heavyweight Championship.

At NWA PowerrrTrip, Matt Cardona defeated Trevor Murdoch to win the NWA Worlds Heavyweight Championship. After the match, he would be confronted by Nick Aldis, the man who Murdoch beat to become the champion. Aldis would enact his rematch clause to face Cardona for the title at the Crockett Cup. On March 1, it was announced that the ambassador for the event, Jeff Jarrett, will also be the special guest referee for the NWA world title match, at the demands of Cardona for an unbiased official.

At NWA 73, Jax Dane attacked his tag team partner Crimson before the latter's hardcore triple threat match with Thom Latimer and Tim Storm, officially dissolving The War Kings. Two weeks later on Powerrr, the former partners participated in a slap fight hosted by then-NWA Worlds Heavyweight Champion Trevor Murdoch. However, Dane would soon punch instead of slap Crimson in the face, causing a scuffle between the two. On September 17, at By Any Means Necessary, Dane would defeat Crimson in a Steel Cage match. At PowerrrTrip the following February, Crimson, now going by Anthony Mayweather, defeated Chris Adonis to win the NWA National Championship. On March 4, it was announced that Mayweather will make his first defense of the title against Dane on Night 2 of the Crockett Cup.

Event

Night 1

Preliminary matches 
During the first night of the Crockett Cup pre-show, Captain Yuma (accompanied by Danny Deals and Jeremiah Plunkett) faced Magic Jake Dumas. In the end, Dumas performed "The Abracadabra" on Yuma to win the match.

Also on the pre-show, The Bad News Boyz (Brandon Tate and Brent Tate), The Heatseekers (Elliott Russell and Matt Sigmon), The Rip City Shooters (Joshua Bishop and Wes Barkley) and Violence Is Forever (Dominic Garrini and Kevin Ku) competed in a four-way match to determine the 16 seed in the tournament. In the end, Brent Tate rolled up Garrini into pinfall to win the match for his team.

After that, The Briscoe Brothers (Jay Briscoe and Mark Briscoe) faced The Now (Hale Collins and Vik Dalishus) in the first round of the Crockett Cup. In the end, Mark Briscoe performed the "Froggy Bow" on Dalishus to win the match for his team.

Preliminary matches 
The actual pay-per-view started with the first round of the Crockett Cup, where The End (Odinson and Parrow) faced Hawx Aerie (Luke Hawx and PJ Hawx). At the end, Odinson put PJ in an airplane spin, howeve, PJ reversed it into a small package to win the match for his team. After the match, The End attacked Hawx Aerie.

Results

2022 Crockett Cup tournament brackets

NWA World Junior Heavyweight Championship Tournament
First Round
Homicide wins a gauntlet match to advance to the finals - Hard Times 2, December 4, 2021
Austin Aries defeated Rhett Titus - Hard Times 2, December 4, 2021
Colby Corino defeated CW Anderson (with George South) - NWA USA, January 8, 2022
Luke Hawx defeated PJ Hawx - NWA USA, January 8, 2022
Ariya Daivari defeated J Spade - NWA USA, January 15, 2022
Kerry Morton (with Ricky Morton) defeated Jamie Stanley - NWA USA, January 22, 2022
Darius Lockhart defeated Sal Rinauro (with Danny Deals) - NWA USA, January 29, 2022

Second Round
Darius Lockhart defeated Ariya Daivari - NWA USA, February 5, 2022
Austin Aries defeated Luke Hawx (with PJ Hawx) - NWA USA, February 5, 2022
Colby Corino (with Jay Bradley and Wrecking Ball Legursky) defeated Kerry Morton (with Ricky Morton) - NWA USA, February 12, 2022

Final
Homicide defeated Austin Aries, Darius Lockhart, and Colby Corino - Crockett Cup (Night 2), March 20, 2022

See also
2022 in professional wrestling

References

External links

2022 in Tennessee
2022 in professional wrestling
National Wrestling Alliance pay-per-view events
2022
March 2022 events in the United States
Events in Nashville, Tennessee
Professional wrestling in Nashville, Tennessee